James Iver McKay (July 17, 1792September 14, 1853) was a member of the United States House of Representatives from North Carolina. He was born in 1792, near Elizabethtown, North Carolina. He pursued classical studies and then law. He was appointed United States attorney for the district of North Carolina on March 6, 1817, and also served in the North Carolina General Assembly (1815–1819, 1822, 1826, and 1830). He was elected as a Jacksonian to the 22nd through 24th congresses (1831–1837) and as a Democrat to the 25th through 30th congresses (1837–1849). He served as chairman of the: Committee on Military Affairs (25th Congress), Committee on the Post Office and Post Roads (26th Congress), Committee on Expenditures in the Department of War (27th Congress), Ways and Means Committee (28th and 29th congresses). He was also the chief sponsor of the Walker Tariff of 1846; and was the favorite son of the North Carolina delegation at the 1848 Democratic National Convention for Vice President. McKay also introduced the Coinage Act of 1849 on the House floor, with it successfully passing.

McKay died in Goldsboro, North Carolina, September 14, 1853. Though an unapologetic slave-owner, his will included the unusual provision that 30–40 of his slaves be placed under the supervision of the American Colonization Society.

See also
Dean of the House of Representatives
List of members of the United States Congress who owned slaves

References

External links 
U.S. Congress Biographical Directory entry

Democratic Party North Carolina state senators
1792 births
1853 deaths
Jacksonian members of the United States House of Representatives from North Carolina
19th-century American politicians
Democratic Party members of the United States House of Representatives from North Carolina
People from Elizabethtown, North Carolina
Deans of the United States House of Representatives
American slave owners